Muskogee is the thirteenth-largest city in Oklahoma and the county seat of Muskogee County. The population of the city was 36,878 as of the 2020 census, a 6.0 percent decrease from 39,223 in 2010.

History

French fur traders were believed to have established a temporary village near the future Muskogee in 1806, but the first permanent European-American settlement was established in 1817 on the south bank of the Verdigris River, north of present-day Muskogee.

After the passage of the Indian Removal Act of 1830 under President Andrew Jackson, the Muscogee Creek Indians were one of the "Five Civilized Tribes" forced out of the American Southeast to Indian Territory. They were accompanied by their slaves. The Indian Agency, a two-story stone building, was built here in Muskogee. It was a site for meetings among the leaders of the Five Civilized Tribes.  Today it serves as a museum. At the top of what is known as Agency Hill, it is within Honor Heights Park on the west side of Muskogee.

In 1872, the Missouri–Kansas–Texas Railroad was extended to the area. A federal court was established in Muskogee in 1889, around the same time that Congress opened portions of Indian Territory to non-Native settlers via land rushes. The city was incorporated on March 19, 1898.

Ohio native Charles N. Haskell moved to the city in March 1901. He was instrumental in building on the land rush; he stimulated expansion of the city of more than 4,000 people to a center of business and industry by 1910, with a population of more than 25,000 inhabitants. Haskell built the first five-story business block in Oklahoma Territory; he built and owned fourteen brick buildings in the city. Most importantly, he organized and built most of the railroads running into the city, which connected it to other markets and centers of population, stimulating its business and retail, and attracting new residents.

As Muskogee's economic and business importance grew, so did its political power. In the years before the territory was admitted as a state, the Five Civilized Tribes continued to work on alternatives to keep some independence from European Americans. They met together August 21, 1905 to propose the State of Sequoyah, to be controlled by Native Americans. They met in Muskogee to draft its constitution, planning to have Muskogee serve as the State's capital. The proposal was vetoed by US President Theodore Roosevelt and mostly ignored by Congress; the proposed State of Sequoyah was never authorized. The US admitted the State of Oklahoma to the Union on November 16, 1907, as the 46th state.

Muskogee was the operational headquarters of the Muskogee Roads, four regional rail carriers under common management.  The first was the Midland Valley Railroad, chartered in 1903.  The three carriers surviving until 1963 were sold to the Texas & Pacific, which was a subsidiary of the Missouri Pacific Railroad

Muskogee was on the route of the Jefferson Highway established in 1915.  That road ran more than 2,300 miles from Winnipeg, Manitoba, to New Orleans, Louisiana.

Muskogee attracted national and international attention when, in May 2008, voters elected John Tyler Hammons as mayor. Nineteen years old at the time of his election, Hammons is among the youngest mayors in American history.

Geography
Muskogee is near the confluence of the Arkansas River, Verdigris River and Grand River. Historically, the area around this confluence has been called Three Rivers.

Muskogee lies in the Arkansas River Valley and has a low, sea-level elevation compared to much of the rest of the state. The city is on the boundary of the oak and hickory forest region of eastern Oklahoma and the prairie, Great Plains region of northeastern Oklahoma. It is a suburban community of Tulsa.

The city's climate is considerably warmer and more humid than other parts of the state.

Climate 
These data were accessed through the WRCC and were compiled over the years 1905 to 2016. The record high occurred in August 1936, and the record low in 1905.

Floods 
Muskogee is a soft spot for floods. In May 2019, waters rose more than 42 feet on the Arkansas River. Those levels had not been reached since 1943 (although 1986 came close with water 39.6 feet high). The U.S.S. Batfish docked at the city's military harbor broke free on the river. Two barges filled with tons of phosphate broke loose and threatened to break the dam they were heading towards. Webber Falls was ordered to evacuate immediately.

Demographics

As of the census of 2000, there were 38,310 people, 15,523 households, and 9,950 families residing in the city. The population density was 1,026.0 people per square mile (396.1/km). There were 17,517 housing units at an average density of 469.1 per square mile (181.1/km). The racial makeup of the city was 61.12% White, 17.90% African American, 12.34% Native American, 0.90% Asian, 0.02% Pacific Islander, 1.57% from other races, and 6.16% from two or more races. Hispanic or Latino of any race were 3.28% of the population.

There were 15,523 households, out of which 29.3% had children under the age of 18 living with them, 45.2% were married couples living together, 15.4% had a female householder with no husband present, and 35.9% were non-families. 31.8% of all households were made up of individuals, and 14.8% had someone living alone who was 65 years of age or older. The average household size was 2.39 and the average family size was 3.00.

In the city the population was spread out, with 25.7% under the age of 18, 9.7% from 18 to 24, 25.8% from 25 to 44, 21.4% from 45 to 64, and 17.4% who were 65 years of age or older. The median age was 37 years. For every 100 females, there were 88.8 males. For every 100 females age 18 and over, there were 83.4 males.

The median income for a household in the city was $26,418, and the median income for a family was $33,358. Males had a median income of $28,153 versus $20,341 for females. The per capita income for the city was $15,351. About 14.6% of families and 19.2% of the population were below the poverty line, including 25.9% of those under age 18 and 14.3% of those age 65 or over.

Transportation
The town is served by U.S. Route 62, U.S. Route 64, U.S. Route 69, Oklahoma State Highway 16, Oklahoma State Highway 165, Oklahoma State Highway 351 and the Muskogee Turnpike.

Intercity bus service is provided by Greyhound Lines.

Muskogee-Davis Regional Airport, five miles south of downtown, has a paved main runway measuring 7202’ by 150’, and can accommodate light planes through heavy transport-type jet aircraft.  The airport had commercial air service from Central Airlines in the 1960s.

Commercial air transportation is available at Tulsa International Airport, about 49 miles to the northwest.

Muskogee operates the Port of Muskogee on the McClellan–Kerr Arkansas River Navigation System, which grants water access to and from the Gulf of Mexico.

Economy 
Muskogee is an economic center for eastern Oklahoma, and is home to several industrial activities. Georgia-Pacific has a tissue, paper towel, and napkin manufacturing plant in Muskogee.  The 2.9 million square foot facility is Muskogee's largest employer with 800 workers.

Arts and culture
Muskogee is home to Honor Heights Park, a World War I memorial park. It is planted with azaleas and hosts the annual Azalea Festival each April. During the winter, Honor Heights is transformed into the Garden of Lights, a  Christmas lights display.

Muskogee has six museums. The Five Civilized Tribes Museum preserves the art and culture of the Five Civilized Tribes. The U.S.S. Batfish and War Memorial Park's major attraction is the submarine . The Three Rivers Museum chronicles the history of the Three Rivers area and the railroads that helped create it. The Oklahoma Music Hall of Fame has been honoring Oklahoma musicians since 1997. The Thomas-Foreman Historic Home, aka the Grant Foreman House is an 1898 farm house preserved with the furnishings of the Indian Territory Judge John R. Thomas and his daughter and son-in-law Grant and Carolyn Foreman, Oklahoma historians and authors. The Ataloa Lodge is on the campus of Bacone College.

Two feature films were shot in Muskogee through a tax incentive program offered by the state: Salvation (2007) and Denizen (2010). Writer and director J.A. Steel produced both films.

Muskogee is home to The Castle of Muskogee. The Castle hosts Fourth of July Fireworks sales, a Halloween festival 'Haunted Castle', a drive-through Christmas Kingdom and indoor Castle Christmas experience, and the Oklahoma Renaissance Festival, founded in 1995. The Renaissance festival draws in tens of thousands each year, hosting jousts, dancing, vendors and other events.

Muskogee Little Theatre (MLT) is part of its flourishing arts scene. It was established in 1972 at the former Sequoyah Elementary School. The theatre puts on up to eight shows per year including youth theatre, senior theatre, holiday shows, and general community productions. The theatre is also committed to education and development arts programs including Youth Theatre camp, voice lessons, mentorships, and weekend workshops.

The City of Muskogee Foundation provides grants to community organizations and non-profit groups throughout the Muskogee community.

The local paper, the Muskogee Phoenix, was founded in February 1888 when Oklahoma was still a territory, and continues to be published today.

Government

Muskogee is governed by a council–manager form of municipal government. The city manager is the administrative leader of the government and is appointed by the city council. The city's ceremonial head is the mayor, who is a voting, at-large member of the council with limited administrative power.

The city is divided into four wards, with two members of the city council elected from each. Each member of the council is elected by the city as a whole but must reside in a specific ward. Elections are held on the first Tuesday in April in each even-numbered year. All elections are non-partisan; the mayor and the members of the city council receive no salary or compensation for their services.

State and federal representation
Muskogee is represented by two state representatives for House Districts 13 and 14. District 13 includes the west side of Muskogee while District 14 includes the east half of Muskogee. The city is represented in the state senate in Senate District 9, which includes all of Muskogee County, Oklahoma.

Both former Attorney General of Oklahoma Drew Edmondson and former Oklahoma Superintendent of Public Instruction Sandy Garrett are Muskogee natives.

The city is part of Oklahoma's 2nd congressional district. The city is also home to former U.S. Senator Tom Coburn.

The city is home to the United States District Court for the Eastern District of Oklahoma

Crime
Since 1995, crime rate has reduced by 45 percent in Muskogee. According to records by the Oklahoma State Bureau of Investigation, in 2002, 2008 and 2009, no murders were committed for the entire year. However, on April 10, 2010, a deadly shooting broke out at the Arrowhead Mall, injuring at least five people and leaving one dead; witnesses say that the shooting was gang-related.

On February 2, 2021, a mass murder occurred when a gunman opened fire at a home, killing six people, including five children, and one woman was seriously injured.

Education
There are two primary public school districts in the city of Muskogee: Muskogee Public Schools, which include the vast majority of the city limits and a large portion of Muskogee County, and Hilldale Public Schools, which covers a small southern portion of the city limits and some parts of the County south of Muskogee. Additional smaller school districts serve the smaller communities of Muskogee County. Muskogee is also home to the Oklahoma School for the Blind, a special institution for meeting the educational needs of blind and visually impaired students residing in the state of Oklahoma. Previous Institutions that where located in the city where Harrell International Institute, Spaulding Institute, and Nazareth Institute.

Muskogee has four institutions of higher education: the public four-year Northeastern State University, the public two-year Connors State College, the public Indian Capital Technology Center and the private four-year Bacone College, which is the oldest college in the state of Oklahoma.

In 2004, civic rights lawyers took on the case of 11-year-old Nashala Hearn who sued the Muskogee, Oklahoma, Public School District for ordering her to remove her hijab because it was violative of the school's dress code. She refused to submit and was subsequently suspended twice.  The court-ordered agreement reached by the Justice Department with the school board permits Nashala, and any other child in Muskogee whose religious beliefs and practices conflict with the school dress code, to receive an accommodation.

Points of interest

 Arrowhead Mall
 Ataloa Lodge Museum
 Azalea Festival
 The Castle of Muskogee
 Civic Center
 Civitan Park
 Douglas Maxey Park
 Farmers market
 Five Civilized Tribes Museum
 Founders' Place Historical District
 Grant Foreman House
 Honor Heights Park
 Katy District (South Main Street)
 Muskogee Little Theatre
 Muskogee Public Library
 Oklahoma Movie Hall of Fame / Roxy Theater
 Oklahoma Music Hall of Fame
 Port of Muskogee
 River Country Family Water Park
 Three Forks Harbor
 Three Rivers Museum
 Thunderbird Speedway
 Spaulding Park
 USS Batfish (SS-310)

In popular culture
Muskogee was commemorated in the 1969 Merle Haggard song "Okie from Muskogee".
The song "Up Against the Wall Redneck Mother" written by Oklahoma native Ray Wylie Hubbard and famously recorded by Jerry Jeff Walker is a satire of small-town life playfully aimed at Okie from Muskogee, which is made evident in the last line of the song: "Muskogee, Oklahoma, U.S.A."
 In the film Twister, the team headed by Helen Hunt's character Jo Harding was based out of the fictional Muskogee State College
 The 1951 film Jim Thorpe – All-American, starring Burt Lancaster, was filmed on the campus of Bacone Indian College at Muskogee.  
 Three feature films were recently shot in Muskogee: Salvation (2007), Denizen (2010), and American Honey (2016).

Sports
Muskogee was home to minor league baseball from 1905 to 1957. Changing monikers frequently, Muskogee hosted the Muskogee Reds (1905), Muskogee Indians (1906), Muskogee Redskins (1907-1908), Muskogee Navigators (1909-1910), Muskogee Redskins (1911), Muskogee Indians (1912), Muskogee Mets (1914-1916), Muskogee Reds (1917), Muskogee Mets (1921-1923), Muskogee Athletics (1924-1926), Muskogee Chiefs (1927-1932), Muskogee Oilers (1933), Muskogee Tigers (1934-1936), Muskogee Reds (1937-1942, 1946–1950) and Muskogee Giants (1951-1957).

Muskogee teams played were members of the Missouri Valley League (1905), South Central League (1906), Oklahoma-Arkansas-Kansas League (1907-1908), Western Association (1909-1911), Oklahoma State League (1912), Western Association (1914-1916-1917), Southwestern League (1921-1923), Western Association (1924-1932), Western League (1933), Western Association (1934-1942, 1946–1954) and Sooner State League (1955-1957).

Three Baseball Hall of Fame inductees played for Muskogee. Bill Dickey played for the 1926 Muskogee Athletics. Bobby Wallace was a player/manager for the 1921 Muskogee Mets. Rube Marquard was a player/manager for the 1933 Muskogee Oilers.

Muskogee was an affiliate of the St. Louis Browns (1932, 1947–1949), Cincinnati Reds (1937-1939), Chicago Cubs (1941), Detroit Tigers (1946) and New York Giants (1936, 1951–1957).

Muskogee teams played at Traction Park from 1905 to 1911. Muskogee then played at Owen Field, which was later renamed to League Park and finally Athletic Park. In April 1923, Babe Ruth with the New York Yankees played an exhibition game at Owen Field against the Brooklyn Dodgers. Later, Mickey Mantle played at Athletic Park in 1950 for the Joplin Miners in games against Muskogee. Traction Park was located in Hyde Park. Today, the Owen Field/League Park/Athletic Park site is occupied by the Muskogee Civic Center.

Muskogee Country Club (Muskogee Golf Club) played host to the 1970 U.S. Women's Open golf tournament won by Donna Caponi.

Meteorite fall of January 20, 2023

On January 20, 2023, at 3:38 AM CST, a slow-moving fireball lit up the sky over Eastern Oklahoma. An accompanying sonic boom was heard by many witnesses in the Oklahoma cities of Bixby, Broken Arrow, Coweta, Wagoner and as far away as Fayetteville, Arkansas. The resulting shockwave shook houses in the affected area, many people reported. Local television station KJRH stated, “Multiple surveillance videos captured the meteor's sights and sounds early Friday morning.” Numerous videos of the event were later posted to social media. The meteor survived to relatively low altitudes, breaking apart soon thereafter, raining down numerous meteorite fragments that ultimately reached the ground. Meteorite enthusiasts from around the country quickly converged on the strewnfield, which was scientifically determined to be in an around the Muskogee area. Reality television meteorite hunter Steve Arnold told reporter Jeanette Quezada of KJRH that “We’re out here hunting…we’re finding rocks."

Notable people
 Reubin Askew, Governor of Florida 1971 to 1979
 Randy Ball, college football head coach, Western Illinois, Missouri State
 Louis W. Ballard, Cherokee and  Osage composer and inductee, Oklahoma Music Hall of Fame
 R. Perry Beaver, Principal Chief of the Muscogee (Creek) Nation
 Maurice R. Bebb, etcher and printmaker
 Aaron Bell, jazz double-bassist
 Keith Birdsong, illustrator known for his Star Trek novel covers
 Tams Bixby, newspaper owner and publisher of Muskogee Phoenix; chairman of Dawes Commission, which he relocated to Muskogee; lived in Muskogee from 1905 to 1922.
 Archie Bradley, Major League Baseball pitcher
 Don Byas, jazz musician
 Kristin Cast, writer
 PC Cast, writer
 Eddie Chuculate, author, graduate of Muskogee High School
 Tom Coburn, former U.S. Senator from Oklahoma
 Isaac N. Coggs, Wisconsin State Assembly
 Fletcher Daniels, Missouri state representative
 Nelson Dean, Negro league baseball player
 Drew Edmondson, former Attorney General of Oklahoma, 2018 gubernatorial candidate
 Ed Edmondson, U.S. Congressman from Oklahoma
 James E. Edmondson, current Oklahoma Supreme Court Justice
 Ernest E. Evans, posthumous Medal of Honor recipient for actions as U.S. destroyer captain in WWII
 George Faught, Former Representative from Oklahoma State House District 14; first Republican in state history to represent Muskogee-based district
 Carolyn T. Foreman (1872-1967), historian, wife of Grant Foreman and daughter of John R. Thomas; lived in Muskogee (1887-1967)
 Sandy Garrett, former Oklahoma Superintendent of Public Instruction and Hilldale Public School teacher
 Susan Golding, former mayor of San Diego, California
 Gloria Greer, actress
 Clu Gulager, actor
 Charles V. Hamilton, political scientist
 John Tyler Hammons, former mayor of Muskogee and one of youngest mayors in United States history
 Justin Harris, Republican member of Arkansas House of Representatives from Washington County, Arkansas; born in Muskogee in 1975
 Charles N. Haskell, noted lawyer, oilman, statesman, and first Governor of Oklahoma
 Darnell Hinson, former professional basketball player
 David R. Hinson, pilot and former head of Midway Airlines
 Lance Hinson, college football coach
 Harold L. Holliday, Missouri state representative
 Olivia Hooker, psychologist and educator
 James Jabara, first American jet ace
 Dennis Jernigan, contemporary Christian music singer/songwriter
 James R. Jones, U.S. Congressman for Oklahoma's 1st District (1973–1987), Chairman of the American Stock Exchange (1989 to 1993), U.S. Ambassador to Mexico (1993 to 1997)
 L. R. Kershaw, lawyer, banker, cattle breeder, real estate developer and candidate for governor
 Barney Kessel, jazz guitarist
 Leo Kottke, acoustic guitarist
 Robert E. Lavender, former Oklahoma Supreme Court Justice
 Seth Littrell, football head coach, North Texas
 Barbara McAlister (opera singer), opera singer
 Roberta McCain, mother of Senator John McCain
 Calvin McCarty, professional Canadian football running back for CFL's Edmonton Eskimos
 Jay McShann, jazz musician
 Bill Mercer, sportscaster, educator and author
 Smokie Norful, Gospel recording artist
 Kevin Peterson, American football player
 Pleasant Porter, principal chief of Creek Nation (1899 – 1907) and president of Sequoyah Constitutional Convention
 Alexander Posey, writer, newspaper editor, secretary of the Sequoyah Constitutional Convention
 Joe A. Rector, American/Cherokee artist
 Robert Reed, actor who played Mike Brady, father on The Brady Bunch
 Bass Reeves, one of the first African-American Deputy U.S. Marshals, who served at the Muskogee Federal Court in Indian Territory, and later became an officer of the Muskogee Police Department
 Alice Mary Robertson, educator, social worker, government official, second woman to serve in the United States Congress
 Muskogee Yargee Ross, pioneer resident
 Pee Wee Russell, jazz musician
 Thomas Ryan, politician, lawyer, lived in Muskogee as representative from Secretary of the Interior
 A. G. W. Sango, lawyer, newspaper editor, school founder
 James M. Shackelford, first United States judge in Indian Territory (1889-1907)
 Jackie Shipp, former NFL player
 The Swon Brothers, duo that gained fame on NBC's The Voice (season 4) , made up of brothers Zach and Colton they finished in third place  
 Mike Synar, former U.S. Representative from Oklahoma 
 John R. Thomas, attorney, Federal judge before Oklahoma statehood, father of historian Carolyn T. Foreman, who married historian Grant Foreman
 Carrie Underwood, country music singer
 Sarah Vowell, author
 Les Walrond, Major League Baseball player
 W. Richard West Jr., director of National Museum of the American Indian
 Claude "Fiddler" Williams, jazz musician
 Larry Winget, speaker and author

References

External links

 Muskogee history and genealogy
 City of Muskogee
 Muskogee Chamber of Commerce
 Muskogee Public Library
 Memoirs of Jeremiah Curtin in the Indian Territory ethnographer's narrative of 1883 visit to Muskogee's early settlement maintained by Library of Congress, accessed January 15, 2007.
 Photographic Record of Muskogee's Historic Homes
 Betty Ritch Lombardi, "Azalea Festival," Encyclopedia of Oklahoma History and Culture.
 The Castle of Muskogee

 
Cities in Oklahoma
Cities in Muskogee County, Oklahoma
Oklahoma populated places on the Arkansas River
County seats in Oklahoma
Micropolitan areas of Oklahoma
1817 establishments in the United States